The Samastha Kerala Jem-iyyathul Ulama (informally abbreviated as the Samastha), 1926, was the principal Sunni-Shafi'i scholarly body in northern Kerala. Most of the ordinary Sunnis of Kerala, adhering to Shafi'i Law, largely followed the Ulama. A forty-member 'mushawara' was the high command body of the Sunni council. The council administered thousands of Shafi'ite mosques, madrasas (institutions where children receive basic Islamic education) and Arabic Colleges (the equivalent of north Indian madrasas).

The council was organised in the aftermath of the 1921 Mappila Uprising as a response to the growing Salafi Movement in Kerala. Prominent community leaders Pangil Ahmed Kutty Musliyar and Varakkal Mullakoya Thangal first convened to form an Ulama at Valiya Jum'ah Masjid, Kozhikode in 1925. Samastha Kerala Jem-iyyathul Ulama was formally constituted at Kozhikode Town Hall in June, 1926 (registered in November, 1934). The council, in the presence of Abdurrahiman Bafaqy Thangal, introduced the "madrasa system", as an alternative to the existing system for children's Islamic education, in September 1949. Religious education and the mahals were organised in 1951 and 1976 respectively. Jamia Nooriya Arabia and the Markaz, premier Shafi'ite institutes of higher religious learning in Kerala, were established in 1965 and 1978 respectively. Darul Huda was founded at Chemmad in 1986. The body witnessed an organisational division during the late 1980s, resulting in the presence two separate Shafi'i scholarly bodies in northern Kerala (the Samastha Kerala Jem-iyyathul Ulama and the Samastha Kerala Jem-iyyathul Ulama affliated to All India Sunni Jem-iyyathul Ulama).

History

Early years 
Samastha Kerala Jem-iyyathul Ulama, a council of principal Sunni-Shafi'i scholars of Malabar District, was organised in 1926 as a response to the growing Salafi Movement in Kerala.

A nascent form of the Ulama was formed at Valiya Jum'ah Masjid, Kozhikode in 1925. This was organised by Pangil Ahmed Kutty Musliyar and Varakkal Mullakoya Thangal with K. P. Muhammad Miran Musliyar as the President and Parol Husain Maulavi as the Secretary. The Ulama was formally constituted on 26 June 1926 at Town Hall, Kozhikode.

Wings (prior to 1989) 

 Scholarly body — Samastha Kerala Jem-iyyathul Ulama
 Education Board — Samastha Kerala Islam Matha Vidhyabhyasa Board
 Mahallu Federation — Sunni Mahallu Federation
 Youth wing — Sunni Yuvajana Samgham (S. Y. S.)
 Students wing — Samastha Kerala Sunni Students' Federation (S.K.S.S.F)
 Mouthpiece  — "Al-Bayan"

Timeline 
1925 — A nascent form of the Ulama inaugurated at Valiya Jum'ah Masjid, Kozhikode.
26 June 1926 — Samastha Kerala Jem-iyyathul Ulama constituted at Kozhikode Town Hall in the presence of Sayyid Cherukunjikkoya Thangal.
7 February 1927 — First conference of Samastha Kerala Jem-iyyathul Ulama at Tanur in the presence of Liyauddeen Hazrath (Nalir Bakhiyath).
December 1929 — Samastha Kerala Jem-iyyathul Ulama published its first periodical Al-Bayan (edited by K. V. Muhammad Musliyar).
1932 June — Pangil Ahmed Kutty Musliyar appointed as the President of Samastha Kerala Jem-iyyathul Ulama (succeeding Varakkal Mullakoya Thangal).
14 Nov 1934 — Samastha Kerala Jem-iyyathul Ulama officially registered by law at Kozhikode District Registrar Office.
September 1949 — The Samastha mushawara introduced the madrasa system (in the presence of Sayyid Abdurrahiman Bafaqy Thangal).
17 September 1951 —  Samastha Kerala Islam Matha Vidhyabhyasa Board (S. K. I. M. V. B) established.
26 April 1954  — S. K. J. U. formed a youth wing named "Sunni Yuvajana Samgham" (S. Y. S.).
1965  — Jamia Nooriyya Arabiyya established at Pattikkad (near Perinthalmanna).
1973 — Formation of Sunni Students' Federation
1976 — Sunni Mahallu Federation established.
1978 — Kanthapuram A. P. Aboobacker Musliyar forms Jamia Markazu Saqafathi Sunniyya at Karanthur, near Kozhikode.
1986  — Establishment of Darul Huda Academy in Chemmad.
1989 — Organisational division.

Councils 
The two current Shafi'ite councils in northern Kerala are named after the initials of leading scholars of each wing (E. K. Aboobacker Musliyar and A. P. Aboobacker Musliyar). Both of them were the leading scholars of Samastha Kerala Jem-iyyathul Ulama, until they were divided in 1989.

 Samastha Kerala Jem-iyyathul Ulama was led E. K. Aboobacker Musliyar (1914–1996) and is currently headed by Sayed Jifri Muthukkoya Thangal.
 Samastha Kerala Jem-iyyathul Ulama affliated to All India Sunni Jem-iyyathul Ulama is led by A. P. Aboobacker Musliyar (born 1939)

Educational activities 
Madrasa in Kerala refers to an extracurricular institution where children receive basic Islamic and Arabic language education. The council managed thousands of Shafi'ite madrasas with millions of enrolled students (the Salafi movement-oriented organisations also manage madrasas in Kerala). Thousands of teachers were also registered with these madrasas. The organisation also run a chain of Arabic Colleges in Kerala (equivalent of north Indian madrasas).

Publications 
Samastha Kerala Jem-iyyathul Ulama started publishing a Malayalam language monthly called "Al-Bayan" in 1929. The magazine was printed in Arabi-Malayalam script. It later ceased publication and started again in October, 1950 in Malayalam script. The council also published short-lived magazines such as "Sunni Times" or "Sunni Voice" (from 1964) and "Muslim" (from 1987, in both Malayalam script and Arabi-Malayalam scripts).

See also
 Samastha Kerala Jem-iyyathul Ulama (EK group)

References

External links
Samastha Kerala Jem-iyyathul Ulama (E. K. Group)  
Samastha Kerala Sunni Vidyabhyasa Board (A. P. Group)

Sunni Islam in India
Islam in Kerala
Samastha